The Copenhagen Pro (CpH Pro) is an annual skateboarding competition held in Copenhagen, Denmark for professional skateboarders.

The competition is held in June or July held at the indoor Copenhagen skatepark with new course each year.

The first competition was in 2007.

2007 

The result from the final 2007

 1. Bastien Salabanzi
 2. Wagner Ramos
 3. Kerry Getz
 4. Daniel Viera
 5. Eero Antilla
 6. Jani Laitiala
 7. Chris Pfanner
 8. Willian Seco
 9. Klaus Bohms
 10. Ricardo Oliveira Assis
 11. Steve Forstner
 12. Roberto Aleman

2008 

The result from the final 2008

 1. Danny Cerezini
 2. Diego Oliveira
 3. Eero Antilla
 4. Jereme Rogers
 5. John Rattray
 6. Eric Koston (2nd qualifiers)
 7. Elton Melino
 8. Daniel Viera
 9. Matt Beach
 10. Rob Gonzales
 11. Pontus Alv
 12. Willian Seco

References 

Skateboarding competitions